Jean-Christophe Filippin (born 18 May 1969) is a French ice hockey player. He competed in the men's tournament at the 1998 Winter Olympics.

References

External links

1969 births
Living people
Anglet Hormadi Élite players
Brûleurs de Loups players
Dauphins d'Épinal players
Diables Rouges de Briançon players
Drakkars de Caen players
Ice hockey players at the 1998 Winter Olympics
Laval Titan players
French expatriate sportspeople in Canada
French expatriate ice hockey people
Olympic ice hockey players of France
Rapaces de Gap players
Sportspeople from Haute-Savoie
Expatriate ice hockey players in Canada